The Diocese of Sassura is a suppressed and titular see of the Roman Catholic Church.
The Roman Town of Sassura, identifiable with Henchir-Ez-Zaouadi in today's Tunisia, is the ancient episcopal seat of the diocese which was in the Roman province of Byzacena.

They are just two of Sassura's documented bishops. 
Servius intervened in the synod assembled in Carthage in 484 by King Huneric the Vandal, after which Servius was exiled. 
Bonifacio took part in the anti-monotheistic council of 641.

Today Sassura survives as a titular bishopric and the current bishop is Rupert Graf zu Stolberg, auxiliary bishop of Munich and Freising.

References

Catholic titular sees in Africa
Roman towns and cities in Tunisia
Archaeological sites in Tunisia
Ancient Berber cities
Ancient cities